Françoise-Athénaïs de Rochechouart de Mortemart, Marquise of Montespan (Madame de Montespan; 5 October 1640  – 27 May 1707) was the most celebrated maîtresse-en-titre of King Louis XIV, by whom she had seven children.

Born into one of the oldest noble families of France, the House of Rochechouart, Madame de Montespan was called by some the "true Queen of France"' during her romantic relationship with Louis XIV, due to the pervasiveness of her influence at court during that time. Her so-called "reign" lasted from around 1667, when she first danced with Louis XIV at a ball hosted by the king's younger brother, Philippe I, Duke of Orléans, at the Louvre Palace, until her alleged involvement in the notorious Affaire des Poisons in the late 1670s to 1680s. Her immediate contemporary was Barbara Villiers, mistress of King Charles II of England.

She is an ancestress of several royal houses in Europe, including those of Spain, Italy, Bulgaria, Portugal, Belgium and Luxembourg.

Early life

Françoise-Athénaïs was born in October 1640 and was baptised on 5 October 1640 at the Château of Lussac-les-Châteaux, today’s Vienne department, in the Poitou-Charentes region in France. Françoise (as a précieuse, she later adopted the name "Athénaïs"), or more formally, Mademoiselle de Tonnay-Charente, possessed the blood of two of the oldest noble families of France through her parents, Gabriel de Rochechouart, the Duke of Mortemart and the Prince of Tonnay-Charente, and Diane de Grandseigne, a lady-in-waiting to Anne of Austria, Queen consort of France.

From her father, she inherited the famous Mortemart esprit ("wit"). As a young girl, she often travelled with her mother between the family estates and the court at the Louvre in Paris. At the age of 12, she began her formal education at the Convent of St Mary at Saintes, where her sister Gabrielle had started hers almost a decade earlier. She was very religious and took Communion once a week, a practice that she would continue as a young woman.

At the age of 20, Françoise-Athénaïs became a maid-of-honour to the king's sister-in-law, Princess Henrietta Anne of England, who was known at court by the traditional honorific of Madame. Later, because of the relationship between her mother and the queen dowager, Anne of Austria, Françoise-Athénaïs was appointed to be a lady-in-waiting to the king's wife, Maria Theresa of Spain.

Marriage
On 28 January 1663, Françoise-Athénaïs married Louis Henri de Pardaillan de Gondrin, Marquis of Montespan, who was one year her junior. Madame de La Fayette says in her Histoire de madame Henriette d'Angleterre that Françoise-Athénaïs was in love with another young man, Louis de La Trémoille, who was the elder son and heir to the Duc de Noirmoutier (one of the leaders of the Fronde). However, La Trémoille had to flee to Spain after a disastrous duel, and Françoise-Athénaïs was betrothed to Montespan. The wedding ceremony took place in a chapel at the Église Saint-Eustache in Paris. Françoise later recounted that as she had neglected to bring along the proper kneeling cushions for the ceremony, the couple had to kneel on dog cushions. She soon became pregnant with her first child, Christine. Two weeks after her daughter's birth she danced in a Court Ballet, and less than a year later her second child was born.

The couple lived in a small house close to the Louvre, which allowed Madame de Montespan to attend court and carry out her duties there as a lady-in-waiting to the Duchess of Orléans. She quickly established herself as the "reigning beauty of the court". Beauty, however, was only one of Madame de Montespan's many charms. She was a cultured and amusing conversationalist, who won the admiration of such literary figures as letter-writer Madame de Sévigné and diarist Saint-Simon. In addition, she kept abreast of political events. This had the effect of making her even more appealing to men of intellect and power. She was courted by a number of suitors including le comte de Frontenac and Marquis de La Fare.

Rise as Maîtresse-en-titre

Madame de Montespan astounded the court by openly resenting the position of Queen Maria Theresa of Spain. The daughter of King Philip IV of Spain and Elisabeth de France, the Queen's Spanish title, before her marriage, was Infanta María Teresa de Austria. In France, she was known as Marie-Thérèse d'Autriche. A scandal arose when the Duchess of Montausier, governess of the royal children and lady-in-waiting to the Queen, was accused of acting as a go-between in order to secure the governorship of the Dauphin for her husband, the Duke of Montausier.

By 1666, Madame de Montespan was trying to take the place of Louis XIV’s current mistress, Louise de La Vallière. Using her wit and charm, she sought to ingratiate herself with the king. She also became close to the Dauphin, whose affection for her never wavered. Even though Louise de La Vallière knew that Montespan was trying to conquer the King's heart and reportedly laughed at her miserable efforts, she definitely underestimated her new rival. Montespan cleverly cultivated friendships with both Louise and Queen Maria Theresa and when both ladies were pregnant, Madame de Montespan was asked to help them entertain the King during private dinners. Soon they regretted their decision, for Montespan now cultivated an intimate relationship with the King. Madame de Montespan was also said to have seduced the King by dropping her towel obligingly when she spotted Louis spying on her while she showered. Shortly after, Louise's position was diminished to second place. To conceal his new relationship, the King placed the ladies in connected rooms they had to share, so he could have access to both. Louise left court and joined a convent perhaps through regret and religiosity or because she had no other option. The spotlight belonged now to the twenty-five-year-old Athénaïs de Montespan.

She also became friends at court with another lady-in-waiting to the queen, Louise Boyer, the wife of Anne, Duke of Noailles. Montespan's youngest son, the Count of Toulouse, would later marry one of Boyer's granddaughters.

Illegitimate children

The first of Madame de Montespan's seven children with the king was born in 1669. The newborn child, a girl, is thought to have been named Louise-Françoise. The upbringing of this first child (and subsequent children) was entrusted to one of Madame de Montespan's friends, Madame Scarron (the future marquise de Maintenon). A son, Louis-Auguste, was born in 1670. When the third child, Louis-César, was born in 1672, a house was purchased for Scarron and the children on the Rue Vaugirard.

In 1673, the couple's three living illegitimate children were legitimised by Louis XIV and given the royal surname of de Bourbon. The eldest, a son, Louis-Auguste de Bourbon, became the duc du Maine; the second child, a son, Louis-César de Bourbon, became the comte de Vexin; and the third, a daughter, Louise-Françoise de Bourbon, became Mademoiselle de Nantes and, in 1685, married the son of the head of the House of Condé, a cadet branch of the reigning House of Bourbon. As Madame de Montespan spent most of her time immersed in the social whirl of the court, the three had little contact with their busy mother and spent most of their childhood with their governess, Madame Scarron.

In 1674, an official separation with her husband was declared by the Procureur général Achille de Harlay, assisted by six judges at the Châtelet.

Due to her role in royal adultery, the Roman Catholic Church soon became her adversary. In 1675, the priest Lécuyer refused to give her absolution,  which was necessary for her to take Easter communion, a requisite for all Catholics. Father Lécuyer raged,

The King appealed to the priest's superiors, but the Church refused to yield to the king's demands. After a short separation, the King and Madame de Montespan resumed their relationship, resulting in the birth of two more children, Françoise Marie de Bourbon, Mademoiselle de Blois, in 1677, and Louis-Alexandre de Bourbon, comte de Toulouse, in 1678. Both were to be legitimised in 1681.

Royal scandal and fall

Affaire des Poisons

The Affaire des Poisons, which erupted in September 1677, was to be the beginning of the end of the reign of La Montespan. Suspicion that Madame de Montespan might be capable of murder or worse began when the King's eye strayed to another beauty, the Duchess of Fontanges. Madame de Montespan's relegation to the position of superintendent of the Queen's household as a result brought matters to a head. Before any further developments in her romance with the King could occur, Mlle de Fontanges died in 1681. Many at the time suspected that she had been poisoned by her rival, although none could prove it. It is now believed that Mlle de Fontanges died from natural causes.

Long assumed to have been involved in the infamous Affaire des Poisons, Madame de Montespan has never been conclusively implicated. Gabriel Nicolas de La Reynie, Paris' first Lieutenant General of Police and the chief judge of the court, before whom the famous poisoning cases were brought, heard testimony that placed Madame de Montespan's first visits to the so-called witch Catherine Monvoisin, known as La Voisin, in 1665. According to this testimony, they repeatedly carried out rituals that would create a special potion for the King. The witch and the Madame de Montespan would call on the devil and pray to him for the King's love. As a way to express her gratitude for her request, they sacrificed a newborn's life by slitting its throat with a knife. Next, the baby's body would be crushed, and the drained blood and mashed bones would be used in the mixture. Louis's food was tainted in this way for almost thirteen years, until the witch was captured after a police investigation where they uncovered the remains of 2,500 infants in La Voisin's garden. No evidence that the garden search ever actually happened has been found. In 1666, Madame de Montespan supposedly went so far as to allow a priest, Étienne Guibourg, to perform a black mass over her nude body in a blood-soaked ceremony, which also, allegedly, included infant sacrifice. Whatever the truth in these allegations, in July 1667, Madame de Montespan became the king's new mistress even though Louise de La Vallière was carrying his child, Louis de Bourbon, comte de Vermandois.

In addition to seeking Louis' love, some charged Madame de Montespan with also conspiring to kill him, but inconsistencies in this testimony suggest that the royal mistress was innocent of these charges. However, suspicion was thrown onto Madame de Montespan because the name of her maid, Mlle Desœillets, was frequently mentioned in connection with La Voisin in the evidence brought before the Chambre Ardente.

Indeed, if anyone was attempting to kill the king, it was more likely Claude de Vin des Œillets, who had an illegitimate child fathered but not publicly acknowledged by Louis. Presumably, the maid resented the loss of Louis' attention.
Olympia Mancini, Countess of Soissons, herself a former mistress of the king and well-known intrigante, was also implicated in the conspiracy.

From the end of 1680 onwards, Louvois, Jean-Baptiste Colbert, and Madame de Maintenon all helped to hush up the affair in order to prevent further scandal about the mother of the king's legitimised children. Concerning the king's need to avoid shocking scandal, Police Chief La Reynie said:

Exile

In 1691, no longer in royal favour, Madame de Montespan retired to the Filles de Saint-Joseph convent,  in the rue Saint-Dominique in Paris, with a pension of half a million francs.  In gratitude for her departure, the king made her father the governor of Paris and her brother, the duc de Vivonne, a marshal of France.  Louis had previously made one of her sisters, Gabrielle, whose vows were only six years old, the abbess of the wealthy Fontevraud Abbey. Gabrielle was appointed abbess in 1670 and it is said that her beauty, wit, and knowledge surpassed Athénaïs’ qualities. The King wanted her to stay longer times at court but Gabrielle always declined and stayed only for very short times.

In her long retirement, Madame de Montespan donated vast sums to hospitals and charities. She was also a generous patron of the arts and letters and befriended Corneille, Racine, and La Fontaine.

Death
The last years of Madame de Montespan's life were given up to a very severe penance.  Real sorrow over her death was felt by her three youngest children. She died on 27 May 1707 at the age of almost sixty-seven while taking the waters at Bourbon-l'Archambault in order to try to heal an illness. The king forbade her children to wear mourning for her.

Appearance and personality
Athénaïs was considered "astonishingly beautiful" by the standards of her time. She had large, blue eyes, long, thick, corn-coloured hair that fell in curls about her shoulders, and a curvaceous, voluptuous body. She was droll, amusing and used her considerable wit to mock others.

She also had an extravagant and demanding nature and possessed enough charm to get what she wanted. She was expensive and glorious, like the Palace of Versailles itself. Her apartments were filled with pet animals and thousands of flowers; she had a private gallery, and costly jewels were showered upon her. She was highly discriminating as regards to the quality of the gems; returning them if they did not meet her exacting standards. She was given the nickname Quanto ("How much", in Italian). Her love for food and her numerous pregnancies caused her to gain weight in her late thirties.

Legacy

Château de Clagny

The Château de Clagny in Versailles was built between 1674 and 1680 from the drawings of Jules Hardouin-Mansart, Premier architecte du Roi, (First architect of the King), on land bought by Louis XIV in 1665. Madame de Sévigné wrote that its construction employed 1,200 workers and the cost was no less than 2 million "livres". The royal gardener André Le Nôtre created the gardens, which looked west toward the much larger palace of Versailles, of which Clagny was a smaller version.  The château de Clagny was also famed for its gallery. In 1685, Louis XIV gave the magnificent palace to Madame de Montespan.  At her death, her oldest son, the duc du Maine, inherited Clagny and, in turn, passed it on to his son, Louis-Auguste de Bourbon, prince de Dombes. The château reverted to the French crown in 1766 and was demolished in 1769.

Trianon de porcelaine

Louis XIV also had a pleasure pavilion, called the Trianon de Porcelaine built for Madame de Montespan, and surrounded by gardens, on the site of the former hamlet of Trianon which he had purchased near the Palace of Versailles. It was meant as a hideaway for the couple. Because of the fragility of the earthenware tiles used in its construction, the Trianon de porcelaine was demolished in 1687 and replaced by the Grand Trianon of pink marble (marbre rose des Pyrénées).

Children by Louis XIV 

  Popular Culture: In the 1979 comedy movie "Love at first bite" Dracula's servant Renfield mentions one of his Master's past loves, The Countess de Montespan.

Notes

References
 
 
 

Attribution

Further reading
 See contemporary memoirs of Madame de Sévigné, of Saint-Simon, of Bussy-Rabutin and others; also the proceedings of the Chambre Ardente preserved in the Archives de la Bastille (Arsenal Library) and the notes of La Reynie preserved in the Bibliothèque Nationale.
 Caylus (Madame de), Les Souvenirs de Madame de Caylus, Collection le Temps retrouvé VI, Mercure de France, Paris, 1965
 Erlanger, Philippe, Louis XIV, Librairie Arthème Fayard, Paris, 1965
 Erlanger, Philippe, Louis XIV, (translated from the French by Stephen Cox), Praeger Publishers, Inc., New York, 1970
 Freeman-Mitford, Nancy (Hon.), The Sun King
 Hilton, Lisa, Athénaïs: The Real Queen of France
 Lenotre, G. Le Château de Rambouillet, six siècles d'Histoire, Calman-Lévy, Paris, 1930
 Petitfils, Jean-Christian, Louis XIV, Perrin, Paris, 1999, 
 Verlet, Pierre, Le Château de Versailles, Librairie Arthème Fayard, Paris, 1961 & 1985
 Tucker, Holly, City of Light, City of Poison: Murder, Magic, and the First Police Chief of Paris, 2017

External links

 
 Full text of Memoirs of Madame de Montespan from Project Gutenberg
 

1640 births
1707 deaths
People from Vienne
Mistresses of Louis XIV
1680 crimes
Francoise-Athenais
Marquesses of Montespan
French ladies-in-waiting
Francoise-Athenais
18th-century French nuns
Francoise-Athenais
Affair of the Poisons
Household of Maria Theresa of Spain
French marchionesses
17th-century French nuns